Gusta may refer to:
Gusta, a diminutive of the Russian male first name Avgust
Gusta, a diminutive of the Russian female first name Avgusta
Gusta, a diminutive of the Russian male first name Avgustin
Gusta, a diminutive and colloquial form of the Russian female first name Avgustina

See also
Aldona Gustas (b. 1932), Lithuanian-German poet and illustrator
Giedrius Gustas (b. 1980), Lithuanian basketball player
Gusto (disambiguation)